The Yallahs River is a river in the parish of Saint Thomas, Jamaica.

Major landslides have developed in the Upper Yallahs River Watershed. As a result, the river carries a greater silt load and scours its banks far more quickly. The Yallahs Ford downstream has widened tremendously, leaving the coastal route vulnerable to inundation after heavy rainstorms.

See also
List of rivers of Jamaica
Yallahs

References

 GEOnet Names Server
OMC Map
CIA Map
Ford, Jos C. and Finlay, A.A.C. (1908).The Handbook of Jamaica. Jamaica Government Printing Office

Rivers of Jamaica